Novoyumashevo (Yañı Yomaş) is a rural locality (a selo) in Michurinsky Selsoviet, Sharansky District, Bashkortostan, Russia. The population was 296 as of 2010. There are 2 streets.

Geography 
Novoyumashevo is located 21 km northeast of Sharan (the district's administrative centre) by road. Timirovo is the nearest rural locality.

References 

Rural localities in Sharansky District